David Black (born October 17, 1980, in Baltimore, Maryland) is an American photographer and director noted for his work with musicians such as Daft Punk, Cat Power, Pharrell Williams and The Roots.

Early life

Black was born on October 17, 1980, in Baltimore, Maryland. His father Richard was a physician and a professor, and his mother MaryAnn was a nurse practitioner; both worked at Johns Hopkins University. As part of his research on the nervous system, Richard took Polaroids of oscilloscope screens and made short films of neurological activity. Richard accumulated a wide range of photographic equipment and experimented with it at home. This equipment later became part of Black's first dark room.
When Black was seven, his family moved to Houston, Texas. When he was thirteen he started shooting portraits of his friends with his father's old Nikon.  His father also taught him how to repair and refurbish vintage cameras, such as a Graflex Speed Graphic that Richard purchased from the Texas Department of Criminal Justice.

When Black was eighteen, he took a summer filmmaking course with director Kelly Reichardt at New York University's Tisch School of the Arts. While there, he made a series of short 16mm films. He moved to San Francisco in 1999 to study photography at the San Francisco Art Institute, where he studied with artists/filmmakers such as Todd Hido, Larry Sultan, George Kuchar and Henry Wessel Jr. In his final year of college, Black transferred to Cooper Union in New York City.

Career

Black's work initially came to public attention when in 2005, MTV exhibited forty of his photographs on the façade of their Time Square Building.  That same year, he began working at Stop Smiling Magazine for editors J.C. Gabel and James Hughes, photographing cultural icons such as Robert Altman, RZA, Peter Bogdanovich, Oliver Stone, D.A. Pennebaker and Bruce Robinson.

Black has since photographed musicians such as Daft Punk, Cat Power, Victoria Legrand, Kendrick Lamar, Mac Miller, Weekend, Tamaryn, Giorgio Moroder, John Cale, Bobby Womack, Wes Lang, James Blake, Best Coast, Peaking Lights, Richard Hell, Oneohtrix Point Never, and Nas. His work has also appeared in publications such as The New York Times, Interview, and Rolling Stone.

In 2010, he began to shoot for commercial clients, and has since photographed campaigns for Nike, Levi's, Microsoft, Chase, Budweiser, Converse and others.

In 2011, Black created images for Ryan Adams’ album Ashes & Fire. In 2013, he was responsible for the photography for Daft Punk's Random Access Memories.

In 2007, Print Magazine named him a top "New Visual Artist Under 30." In 2008, The Art Directors Club of New York named him as one of their "Young Guns (YG5)", and in 2011, Photo District News named him one of the "PDN 30 Emerging Photographers to Watch".

Black served as a visiting professor at The San Francisco Art Institute in 2007, and as an adjunct professor of Photography at Pratt Institute in Brooklyn, New York from 2008 to 2010.

Personal life

David relocated to Los Angeles in 2009.  He is represented by Giant Artists agency.

References 

American photographers
Living people
1980 births
Artists from Baltimore